Viktor Andreevich Polupanov (born January 1, 1946, in Moscow, Soviet Union) is a retired ice hockey player who played in the Soviet Hockey League.  He played for HC CSKA Moscow and Krylya Sovetov Moscow.  He was inducted into the Russian and Soviet Hockey Hall of Fame in 1967.

External links
 Russian and Soviet Hockey Hall of Fame bio

1946 births
Living people
HC CSKA Moscow players
Ice hockey people from Moscow
Russian ice hockey players
Olympic medalists in ice hockey
Ice hockey players at the 1968 Winter Olympics
Olympic ice hockey players of the Soviet Union
Olympic gold medalists for the Soviet Union